Olearia arguta is a species of flowering plant in the family Asteraceae and is endemic to northern Australia. It was first formally described in 1867 by George Bentham from specimens collected on an island in the Gulf of Carpentaria by Robert Brown. The specific epithet (arguta) means "sharply-toothed".

Bentham also described two subspecies and the names are accepted by the Australian Plant Census:
 Olearia arguta Benth. var. arguta
 Olearia arguta var. lanata Benth.

Olearia arguta occurs in the Kimberley region of Western Australia, the Top End of the Northern Territory and in north Queensland. It is listed as "not threatened" by the Department of Biodiversity, Conservation and Attractions, and as of "least concern" under the Northern Territory Territory Parks and Wildlife Conservation Act 1976.

References

Flora of Western Australia
Flora of the Northern Territory
Flora of Queensland
arguta
Plants described in 1867
Taxa named by George Bentham